Trapped is a 1931 American crime drama film directed by Bruce M. Mitchell and starring Nick Stuart, Priscilla Dean and Nina Quartero.

Cast

References

Bibliography
 Michael R. Pitts. Poverty Row Studios, 1929–1940: An Illustrated History of 55 Independent Film Companies, with a Filmography for Each. McFarland & Company, 2005.

External links
 

1931 films
1931 crime drama films
American crime drama films
Films directed by Bruce M. Mitchell
1930s English-language films
1930s American films